Robert Orr Jr. (March 5, 1786 at Hannastown, Westmoreland County, Pennsylvania – May 22, 1876 at Kittanning, Pennsylvania) was a Pennsylvania political figure.

Biography
Orr was the son of Hugh Orr, a Scottish-born gunsmith and politician. He attended the public schools in Westmoreland County and Armstrong County, Pennsylvania.  He later moved to Kittanning, where he was elected to the post of Deputy Sheriff for Armstrong County in 1805.  He studied surveying and was appointed deputy district surveyor.

Orr served in the War of 1812, where he rose to the rank of colonel in the US Army.

Post-war political career
In 1816 Orr successfully ran for a seat in the Pennsylvania House of Representatives.  He served two terms (1817–1820), after which he successfully ran for a seat in the Pennsylvania Senate.  He served there from 1821 to 1825; he resigned before completing his term because he had been appointed as a Jacksonian member of the Nineteenth Congress U.S. House of Representatives to fill the vacancy caused by the resignation of James Allison Jr.

In 1826 Orr successfully ran for re-election, to the Twentieth Congress.  He served in that capacity from October 11, 1825 to March 3, 1829.

Military career
After the War of 1812 Orr retained his interest in military affairs.  He eventually attained the rank of general.

Later life
Orr resided for a short while in Orrsville in 1845, and lived in Allegheny City, Pennsylvania from 1848 to 1852.  He returned to Kittanning, where he died in 1876.  He was buried in the Kittanning Cemetery.

References
Notes

Sources

The Political Graveyard

1786 births
1876 deaths
People from Westmoreland County, Pennsylvania
Pennsylvania state senators
Members of the Pennsylvania House of Representatives
United States Army personnel of the War of 1812
Jacksonian members of the United States House of Representatives from Pennsylvania
19th-century American politicians
United States Army generals